Huai So is a tambon (subdistrict) of Chiang Khong District, in Chiang Rai Province, Thailand. The main settlement of the subdistrict is also named Huai So.

Administration
The area of the subdistrict forms a Subdistrict Municipality (thesaban tambon) as its local government. In 1995 it was established as a tambon administrative organization (TAO) and upgraded to a municipality in 2007.

The subdistrict is divided into 23 administrative villages (mubans).

References

External links
thaitambon.com 

Tambon of Chiang Rai province
Populated places in Chiang Rai province